Starbound Beast is the second studio album by Highland Park, California heavy metal band Huntress. It was released on July 2, 2013.

Track listing

Music by Huntress and lyrics by Jill Janus, except where noted.

Personnel
Huntress
Jill Janus – vocals 
Blake Meahl – lead guitar
Anthony Crocamo – rhythm guitar
Ian Alden – bass
Carl Wierzbicky – drums

Production
Zeuss - production, engineering, mixing, and mastering
Vance Kelley - artwork and layout

References

2013 albums
Huntress (band) albums
Napalm Records albums
Albums produced by Chris "Zeuss" Harris